The Academy at Charlemont is a small, private, college-preparatory day school, located on the Deerfield River in Charlemont, Massachusetts, that serves grade 6 through postgraduate. The school was founded by Eric Grinnell, Dianne Grinnell, David W. McKay, Patricia D. W. McKay, Margaret J. Carlson, and Lucille Joy in 1981 as an experiment in bringing classical and community-oriented education to rural Western Massachusetts—specifically Franklin County, Massachusetts.

The school's educational philosophy, which is substantially influenced by American philosopher and psychologist John Dewey, rests on four core beliefs:

 that emphasizing connections among the academic disciplines because real world challenges require citizens to think beyond the discrete boundaries of academic disciplines, to look at things from many different angles;
 that a school community based on certain particular values—including self-reliance, industry, integrity, and compassion – encourages development of intellectual and social standards that reflect those values;
 that affirming the uniqueness of each individual and at the same time insisting that individuals subscribe to a set of commonly held standards – civility, respect, concern for others – produces a healthy tension that helps students learn, grow, and become productive citizens; and
 that the academic, liberal arts tradition is a challenging, intellectually stimulating ground on which young people can both learn to use their minds well, and furnish those minds with the kind of broad, basic knowledge needed to succeed in college and as citizens of the world.

Notable alumni
 Bo Peabody 1990, co-founder and Managing General Partner of Village Ventures and Venture Partner at Greycroft Partners 
 Sarah Hartshorne 2005, appeared on America's Next Top Model, Cycle 9
 Augustus Muller 2007, of Boy Harsher
 Abby Weems 2012, vocalist and guitarist of Potty Mouth

External links

References

Private high schools in Massachusetts
Educational institutions established in 1981
Schools in Franklin County, Massachusetts
Private middle schools in Massachusetts
1981 establishments in Massachusetts